Ali Eren Balıkel (born 27 July 1979 in Adana) is a Turkish entrepreneur.

He grew up in the ancient Kilikya region of Turkey. As the fourth child of a civil servant father and a housewife, Ali Eren moved to Mersin with his family due to the business of his father. He completed his primary, secondary and high school education in Mersin. Eren applied to London School of Commerce's (LSC) business management department where he attended “Introduction to Business Management” courses for one year, and completed his education at University of Wales Institute of Cardiff (UWIC) in a co-operated program. Eren's Master's thesis, titled “How to Establish a Strong & Innovative Mediterranean Cuisine Restaurant in London”, was deemed worthy of honor award by the University of Gloucestershire and attained a place among the most valuable thesis studies in university's library. He started a restaurant, Kilikya's Cafe Bar Restaurant. Kilikya's restaurant hosted a number of famous figures including singer Cem Adrian, politician Abdüllatif Şener, former Sports and Youth Minister of Turkey Suat Kılıç, Oscar award-winning actress Helen Mirren, American actor Robert De Niro and Turkish actress Asuman Dabak as well as the Prime Minister of Kuwait. Eren also attended the Master of Politics Postgraduate program of Queen Mary University and completed his studies there too. During his study, he worked as a consultant for former Labour party member of Parliament, Jim Fitzpatrick. After finishing his political master, Ali Eren put focus on his business life by opening 2 other branches of Kilikya in Mile End and Canary Wharf and premier concept Jazzgir Restaurant in 2017. Eren enrolled in a Doctor of Business Administration program in Britain and a Doctor of Politics program in Switzerland.

References

Turkish restaurateurs
1979 births
Living people